Horrocks or Horrox may refer to

People
 Amy Elsie Horrocks (1867–ca. 1920), English music educator, pianist and composer
 Brian Horrocks (1895–1985), British Army lieutenant-general in the Second World War
 Chris Horrocks (soccer) (born 1954), Canadian former international and North American Soccer League player
 Chris Horrocks (writer), associate professor of art history and author
 Dylan Horrocks (born 1966), New Zealand cartoonist 
Geoffrey Horrocks (mathematician) (1932/33 – 2012), British mathematician
Geoffrey Horrocks (philologist) (born 1951), British philologist 
 Ian Horrocks (born 1958), British professor of computer science at the University of Oxford
 Ian Horrocks (RAF officer) (died 2014), British Royal Air Force pilot and air commodore
 James Horrocks (died 1772), American Anglican clergyman and sixth president of the College of William and Mary
 Jane Horrocks (born 1964), British comedian and actress
 Jeremiah Horrocks (1618–1641), English astronomer
 John Horrocks (cotton manufacturer) (1768–1804), British cotton manufacturer
 John Horrocks (fisherman) (1816–1881), Scottish founder and innovator of modern European fly fishing
 John Ainsworth Horrocks, (1818–1846), English-born explorer and settler in South Australia
 Joseph Horrocks (1803–1866), British convict transported to Western Australia
 Mark Horrocks (born 1977), English former cricketer
 Nancy Horrocks (1900–1989), British artist
 Norman Horrocks (1927–2010), Professor Emeritus and Adjunct Professor at the School of Information Management, Dalhousie University, Nova Scotia, Canada
 Peter Horrocks (born 1959), British television producer
 Ray Horrocks (1930–2011), British automobile chief executive (BL), in the 1980s
 Richard Horrocks (1857–1926), English cricketer
 Rosemary Horrox (born 1951), English historian
 Vic Horrocks (1884–1922), English footballer
 William Horrocks (1859–1941), British military doctor
 William Horrocks (cricketer) (1905–1985), English cricketer

Places
 Horrocks, Western Australia, a small town
 Horrocks Pass, a pass in the southern Flinders Ranges in South Australia
 Horrocks Block, a mostly sandstone outcrop on Alexander Island, Antarctica
 Horrocks (crater), a lunar crater named after Jeremiah Horrocks

Other uses 
 Tony Horrocks, a fictional character on the soap opera Coronation Street
 Horrocks Highway, a section of the Main North Road, Adelaide, South Australia

See also
 Horrocks loom, a type of power loom used to weave cotton

English-language surnames